"I Dare You" is a song by American singer Kelly Clarkson. Produced and written by Jesse Shatkin, with additional writing by Natalie Hemby, Laura Veltz, Ben West, and Jeff "Gitty" Gitelman, it was released as a stand-alone single by Atlantic Records on April 16, 2020. Unlike her previous records, its single release includes multiple versions of the song recorded in several languages as a duet featuring various recording artists—such as French singer Zaz, Canadian-Moroccan singer Faouzia for the Moroccan Arabic version, Spanish singer Blas Cantó, German musical duo Glasperlenspiel, Israeli singer Maya Bouskilla for the Hebrew version, and the American Deaf West Theatre for the American Sign Language version. The Hebrew version reached number one in Israel.

Background and release 
"I Dare You" was written by Jesse Shatkin and Gitty, Natalie Hemby, Laura Veltz and Ben West. In her opening monologue on a February 2020 episode of her self-titled talk show, Clarkson revealed her plans to release the song. Israeli singer Maya Bouskilla also announced that she was invited by Warner Music Group (Atlantic Records's parent label) to record the song as a duet with Clarkson as part of a single release featuring select recording artists from all over the world, which included French singer Zaz, Canadian-Moroccan singer Faouzia, Spanish singer Blas Cantó, and German musical duo Glasperlenspiel. She also announced plans to film the single's debut live performance on The Kelly Clarkson Show on March 24, its original intended date of release, but was halted due to the COVID-19 pandemic. On April 3, 2020, Clarkson announced the single's release date as April 16, 2020, accompanied by a special episode of The Kelly Clarkson Show the same day.

Critical reception 
"I Dare You" has received widespread critical acclaim, with critics praising the unique six-language recording of the song and the various vocal performances, particularly of  Clarkson, who recorded the song in all six languages.

Track listing

Personnel 
Credits adapted from Spotify metadata.

 Vocals – Kelly Clarkson
 Featured vocals – Zaz (Appelle ton amour version)
 Featured vocals – Faouzia (كنتحداك version)
 Featured vocals – Blas Cantó (Te Reto A Amar version)
 Featured vocals – Glasperlenspiel (Trau Dich version)
 Featured vocals – Maya Bouskilla (בוא נראה version)
 Background Vocals – Harlœ
 Background vocals – Natalie Hemby
 Guitar – Benji Lysaght
 Mastering – Chris Gehringer
 Guitar – Erick Serna
 Engineer – Jasmine Chen
 Guitar – Jeff "Gitty" Gitelman
 Bass, drums, drum programming, guitar, keyboards, engineering, production, percussion, synthesizer – Jesse Shatkin
 Mixing engineering – John Hanes
 Drums, strings – Sam Dent
 Engineer – Sam Dent
 Mixer – Serban Ghenea
 Piano – Tommy King
 Recording coordinator – Yakov Lamay (בוא נראה version)

Charts

Weekly charts

Year-end charts

Release history

References 

2020 singles
2020 songs
Arabic-language songs
Atlantic Records singles
French-language songs
German-language songs
Hebrew-language songs
Kelly Clarkson songs
Macaronic songs
Song recordings produced by Jesse Shatkin
Songs written by Natalie Hemby
Songs written by Jesse Shatkin
Songs written by Laura Veltz
Spanish-language songs
Zaz (singer) songs
Blas Cantó songs
Songs written by Jeff Gitelman